R402 road  may refer to:
 R402 road (Ireland)
 R402 road (South Africa)